Nanomia bijuga is a species of siphonophore in the family Agalmatidae.

References 

Agalmatidae
Taxa named by Stefano delle Chiaje
Animals described in 1844